Alekseyevka is a village in Chüy Region of Kyrgyzstan. Its population was 7,991 in 2021.

Population

References

Populated places in Chüy Region